Unai Marino Alkorta (born 10 December 1999) is a Spanish footballer who plays as a goalkeeper for SD Amorebieta.

Club career
Born in Ondarroa, Biscay, Basque Country, Marino finished his formation with SD Eibar, and made his senior debut with the club's second reserve team in the regional leagues in 2017. On 31 May 2018, he moved to Tercera División side Bermeo FT.

In July 2019, Marino signed for another reserve team, Polvorín FC also in the fourth division. After featuring rarely, joined fellow league team UA Horta roughly one year later, but terminated his contract with the club on 27 January 2021.

On 28 January 2021, Marino agreed to a contract with Segunda División B side SD Amorebieta, and was mainly a backup to Mikel Saizar as his side achieved a first-ever promotion to Segunda División at the end of the campaign.

Marino made his professional debut on 20 November 2021, starting in a 0–2 away loss against Real Oviedo.

References

External links

1999 births
Living people
People from Ondarroa
Spanish footballers
Footballers from the Basque Country (autonomous community)
Association football goalkeepers
Segunda División players
Segunda División B players
Tercera División players
Divisiones Regionales de Fútbol players
Polvorín FC players
UA Horta players
SD Amorebieta footballers
Sportspeople from Biscay